Latinisation (or Latinization) of names, also known as onomastic Latinisation, is the practice of rendering a non-Latin name in a Latin style. It is commonly found with historical proper names, including personal names and toponyms, and in the standard binomial nomenclature of the life sciences. It goes further than romanisation, which is the transliteration of a word to the Latin alphabet from another script (e.g. Cyrillic). For authors writing in Latin, this change allows the name to function grammatically in a sentence through declension. 

In a scientific context, the main purpose of Latinisation may be to produce a name which is internationally consistent.

Latinisation may be carried out by:

 transforming the name into Latin sounds (e.g.  for ), or
 adding Latinate suffixes to the end of a name (e.g.  for Meibom), or
 translating a name with a specific meaning into Latin (e.g.  for Italian ; both mean 'hunter'), or 
 choosing a new name based on some attribute of the person (e.g. Daniel Santbech became , possibly from the Latin (actually Latinised Gaulish for 'new field') name for the town of Nijmegen).

Personal names 

Humanist names, assumed by Renaissance humanists, were largely Latinised names, though in some cases (e.g. Melanchthon) they invoked Ancient Greek. Latinisation in humanist names may consist of translation from vernacular European languages, sometimes involving a playful element of punning. Such names could be a cover for humble social origins.

The title of the "Wilhelmus", national anthem of the Netherlands, preserves a Latinised form of the name of William the Silent.

Place names 
In English, place names often appear in Latinised form. This is a result of many early text books mentioning the places being written in Latin. Because of this, the English language often uses Latinised forms of foreign place names instead of anglicised forms or the original names.

Examples of Latinised names for countries or regions are:
Estonia (Estonian name , Dutch/German/Scandinavian name , i.e. 'land of the Aesti')
Ingria (Finnish , German/Scandinavian , i.e. 'land of the Ingermans', the local tribe)
Livonia (German/Scandinavian name ', i.e. 'land of the Livs', the local tribe)
 was the Latinised name for the modern English city York. It is a Latinised form of the Brittonic name  which means 'place of (the) yew trees'. The Common Brittonic language was spoken by the indigenous people of Britain and evolved into modern Welsh, Cornish, and Breton (Brezhoneg).

Scientific names 

Latinisation is a common practice for scientific names. For example, the name of a genus of palm trees, is a Latinisation of Livingstone.

Historical background
During the age of the Roman Empire, translation of names into Latin (in the West) or Greek (in the East) was common. Additionally, Latinised versions of Greek substantives, particularly proper nouns, could easily be declined by Latin speakers with minimal modification of the original word.

During the medieval period, after the Empire collapsed in Western Europe, the main bastion of scholarship was the Roman Catholic Church, for which Latin was the primary written language. In the early medieval period, most European scholars were priests and most educated people spoke Latin, and as a result, Latin became firmly established as the scholarly language for the West.

During modern times Europe has largely abandoned Latin as a scholarly language (most scientific studies and scholarly publications are printed in English), but a variety of fields still use Latin terminology as the norm. By tradition, it is still common in some fields to name new discoveries in Latin. And because Western science became dominant during the 18th and 19th centuries, the use of Latin names in many scholarly fields has gained worldwide acceptance, at least when European languages are being used for communication.

References

Sources
 

Latin language
Names